Dinamo de San Juan Club de Fútbol is a Spanish football team based in Santurtzi, in the Autonomous Community of the Basque Country. Founded in 1973, they play in División de Honor de Vizcaya, holding home games at Campo de Fútbol de San Jorge which has a capacity of 2,000 spectators.

Season to season

References

External links
Soccerway team profile

Football clubs in the Basque Country (autonomous community)
Association football clubs established in 1973
1973 establishments in Spain
Sport in Biscay